An electric unicycle (often initialized as EUC or acronymized yuke or Uni) is a self-balancing personal transporter with a single wheel. The rider controls speed by leaning forwards or backwards, and steers by twisting or tilting the unit side to side. The self-balancing mechanism uses accelerometers, gyroscopes, and a magnetometer. In 2020, suspension models were introduced by three major manufacturers Begode, Kingsong and Inmotion.

Operation
Commercial units are self-balancing in a forward and backward direction, with side-to-side (lateral) stability being provided by the steering motions of the rider, similar to Bicycle and motorcycle dynamics. As of 2022, no commercial human-rideable unicycle has lateral self-balancing capabilities. However, a non-ridable, dual-axis self-balancing unicycle was demonstrated in 2012, with small, lightweight robots using a large weighted reaction wheel or control moment gyroscope. The control of a unicycle can be considered to be an inverted pendulum.

History

Early experimentation

A hand-power monowheel was patented in 1869 by Richard C. Hemming with a pedal-power unit patented in 1885. Various motorized monowheels were developed and demonstrated during the 1930s without commercial success and Charles F Taylor was granted a patent for a "vehicle having a single supporting and driving wheel" in 1964 after some 25 years of experimentation. In 1977 Charles Gabriel presented an electric unicycle that resembles the design of today's devices.

Commercialisation
In 2003, Bombardier announced a conceptual design for such a device used as a sport vehicle, the Embrio. In September 2004 Trevor Blackwell demonstrated a functional self-balancing unicycle, using the control-mechanism similar to that used by the Segway PT and published the designs as the Eunicycle.. This approach was further refined by a group of engineering students at the University of Adelaide who developed The Micycle, which incorporated a hub-motor, a Lithium-Ion Battery and a novel steering mechanism where the wheel pivoted independent of the main chassis.

In March 2010 Shane Chen of Inventist filed a patent application for a seatless electric unicycle (associated with the "Solowheel" product launched in February 2011), which uses flat pedals to stand on and leg contact surfaces to allow for stable, precise control in lieu of a seat. In Oct 2010 Focus Designs published a video of an electric unicycle with hub motor and a seat.
Late in 2015, the Ford Motor Company patented a "self-propelled unicycle engageable with vehicle", intended for last-mile commuters.  Segway launched their One S1 model in November of 2017.

By the turn of the decade, several Chinese manufacturers dominate the market and continue to release EUC models with higher top speeds (above 75 km/h or 46 mph), and longer range batteries.
Popularity came around the same time as Begode (formerly known as Gotway) released their M super line. This evolved into the MSX & MSP models and eventually into the RS model. Around this time Veteran stepped on to the scene for the first time with their road wheel the Sherman. 
In 2020, suspension EUCs were revealed by Inmotion, Kingsong and Gotway.

Suspension
In chronological order, the following suspension-models were released:
the Inmotion V11
the Kingsong S18
the Begode EX

Popular culture 
 A motorized, gyroscopically balanced unicycle was described in 1940 in the story The Roads Must Roll by Robert Heinlein.
 A self-balancing unicycle was described in 1969 in The Man From R.O.B.O.T., a short story by science fiction author Harry Harrison.

Gallery

Manufacturers

 Begode (previously known as Gotway)
 Guangzhou Veteran Intelligent Technology 
 InMotion
 Inventist
 Kingsong
 Rockwheel
 Segway – Ninebot

See also
 
 Ballbot, a mobile robot designed to balance on a single spherical wheel
 Electric bicycle
 Honda U3-X, which looks like a self-balancing unicycle, but balances on a powered Omni wheel
 Inertia wheel pendulum
 Onewheel, a sort of electric skateboard
 RIOT wheel, a ridable single-axis self-balancing unicycle with an unusually low centre of gravity, with its rider in front of, rather than on top of its single wheel 
 Unicycle
 Uno, a sort of dicycle

References

Further reading
Research papers (in reverse date order)
Daniel R. Gilman "Riding an EUC – From Never-Ever to Expert – A Detailed Written Guide https://forum.electricunicycle.org/topic/21537-learn-to-ride-an-euc-a-detailed-written-guide-from-never-ever-to-expert/
 
 
 
 Ben S. Cazzolato, David Keith Caldecott, Andrew John Edwards, Matthew Anthony Haynes, Miroslav Jerbic, Andrew Christopher Kadis and Rhys James J. Madigan Micycle - A Self-Balancing Unicycle, University of Adelaide, 2010
 
 
 
 
 
 A. Schoonwinkel, Design and test of a computer stabilized unicycle Ph.D. dissertation, Stanford University, California, 1987

Other
 Flexible two-wheeled self-balancing mobile robot, 9th IFAC Symposium on Robot Control (2009)

Electric vehicles
Cycle types
Unicycling
Personal transporters